Cezar Răducanu (born 21 May 1958) is a Romanian modern pentathlete. He competed at the 1980 Summer Olympics, finishing in 41st place in the individual event.

References

1958 births
Living people
Romanian male modern pentathletes
Olympic modern pentathletes of Romania
Modern pentathletes at the 1980 Summer Olympics